The Douglas C-124 Globemaster II, nicknamed "Old Shaky", is an American heavy-lift cargo aircraft built by the Douglas Aircraft Company in Long Beach, California.

The C-124 was the primary heavy-lift transport for United States Air Force (USAF) Military Air Transport Service (MATS) during the 1950s and early 1960s, until the Lockheed C-141 Starlifter entered service. It served in MATS, later Military Airlift Command (MAC), units of the Air Force Reserve and Air National Guard until retired in 1974.

Design and development
Douglas Aircraft developed the C-124 from 1947 to 1949, from a prototype they created from a World War II–design Douglas C-74 Globemaster, and based on lessons learned during the Berlin Airlift. The aircraft was powered by four large Pratt & Whitney R-4360 Wasp Major piston engines producing  each. The C-124's design featured two large clamshell doors and a hydraulically actuated ramp in the nose as well as a cargo elevator under the aft fuselage. The C-124 was capable of carrying  of cargo, and the  cargo bay featured two overhead hoists, each capable of lifting . As a cargo hauler, it could carry tanks, guns, trucks and other heavy equipment, while in its passenger-carrying role it could carry 200 fully equipped troops on its double decks or 127 litter patients and their attendants. It was the only aircraft of its time capable of transporting fully assembled heavy equipment such as tanks and bulldozers.

The C-124 first flew on 27 November 1949, with the C-124A being delivered from May 1950. The C-124C was next, featuring more powerful engines, and an APS-42 weather radar fitted in a "thimble"-like structure on the nose. Wingtip-mounted combustion heaters were added to heat the cabin, and enable wing and tail surface deicing. The C-124As were later equipped with these improvements.

One C-124C, 52-1069, c/n 43978, was used as a JC-124C, for testing the  Pratt & Whitney XT57 (PT5) turboprop, which was installed in the nose.

Operational history

First deliveries of the 448 production aircraft began in May 1950 and continued until 1955. The C-124 was operational during the Korean War, and was also used to assist supply operations for Operation Deep Freeze in Antarctica. They performed heavy lift cargo operations for the U.S. military worldwide, including flights to Southeast Asia, Africa and elsewhere. From 1959 to 1961 they transported Thor missiles across the Atlantic to England. The C-124 was also used extensively during the Vietnam War transporting materiel from the U.S. to Vietnam. Until the C-5A became operational, the C-124, and its sister C-133 Cargomaster were the only aircraft available that could transport very large loads.

The United States Air Force's Strategic Air Command (SAC) was the initial operator of the C-124 Globemaster, with 50 in service from 1950 through 1962. Four squadrons operated the type, consisting of the 1st, 2nd, 3rd and 4th Strategic Support Squadrons. Their primary duty was to transport nuclear weapons between air bases and to provide airlift of SAC personnel and equipment during exercises and overseas deployments.

The Military Air Transport Service (MATS) was the primary operator until January 1966, when the organization was retitled Military Airlift Command (MAC). Within a few years following the formation of MAC, the last remaining examples of the C-124 were transferred to the Air Force Reserve (AFRES) and the Air National Guard (ANG), said transfers being complete by 1970. The first ANG unit to receive the C-124C, the 165th Tactical Airlift Group (now known as the 165th Airlift Wing) of the Georgia Air National Guard, was the last Air Force unit to retire their aircraft (AF Serial No. 52-1066 and 53-0044) in September 1974.

Variants

YC-124
Prototype rebuilt from a C-74 with a new fuselage and powered by four 3,500 hp R-4360-39 engines, it was later re-engined and redesignated YC-124A.
YC-124A
Prototype YC-124 re-engined with four 3,800 hp R-4360-35A engines.
C-124A
Douglas Model 1129A, production version with four 3,500 hp R-4360-20WA engines; 204 built, most retrofitted later with nose-radar and combustion heaters in wingtip fairings.
YC-124B
Douglas Model 1182E was a turboprop variant of the C-124A with four Pratt & Whitney YT34-P-6 turboprops; originally proposed as a tanker, it was used for trials on the operation of turboprop aircraft. Originally designated C-127.
C-124C
Douglas Model 1317, same as C-124A but with four 3,800 hp R-4360-63A engines, nose radar, wingtip combustion heaters and increased fuel capacity; 243 built.

Operators

 United States Air Force
Military Air Transport Service / Military Airlift Command
1501st Air Transport Wing / 60th Military Airlift Wing
1502nd Air Transport Wing / 61st Military Airlift Wing
1503rd Air Transport Wing / 65th Military Airlift Group
1607th Air Transport Wing / 436th Military Airlift Wing
1608th Air Transport Wing / 437th Military Airlift Wing

Accidents and incidents
23 March 1951: A C-124A 49-0244 flying from Loring to Mildenhall RAFB reported a fire in the cargo crates, signaling Mayday. They began jettisoning the crates and announced they were ditching. The C-124 ditched at approximately,  700 miles southwest of Ireland. The aircraft was intact when it touched down on the ocean. All hands exited the aircraft wearing life preservers and climbed into the inflated 5-man life rafts. The rafts were equipped with cold-weather gear, food, water, flares, and Gibson Girl hand crank emergency radios. Shortly after the men were in the life rafts, a B-29 pilot out of Ireland spotted the rafts and the flares that the men had ignited. Their location was reported and the pilot left the scene when his fuel was getting low. No other United States or Allied planes or ships made it to the ditch site for over 19 hours, until Sunday, 25 March 1951. When the ships arrived all they found were some charred crates and a partially deflated life raft. Ships and planes continued searching for the next several days but not a single body was found. There is circumstantial evidence that the airmen may have been "snatched" by the Soviet Union for their intelligence value, but their fate remains a mystery. See 1951 Atlantic C-124 disappearance.
22 November 1952: C-124A 51-0107 flying out of McChord Air Force Base in Washington state crashed into the Colony Glacier on Mount Gannett, 40 miles east of Anchorage, Alaska, killing all 41 passengers and 11 crew. Debris from the plane and remains of some of the victims were found by the Alaska National Guard on June 10, 2012 having apparently been uncovered due to the receding of the glacier. By 2014 remains of 17 victims had been recovered.
20 December 1952: C-124 50-0100 flying out of Moses Lake, Washington (Larson AFB) and taking airmen home to Texas for the holidays as part of "Operation Sleigh Ride" crashed not long after takeoff. A total of 87 airmen were killed.
18 June 1953: C-124 51-137 took off from Tachikawa Air Base in Japan. Shortly after takeoff, one of the engines failed, forcing the pilot to make an emergency landing. Due to a loss of airspeed, the pilot lost control and crashed into a melon patch, killing all seven crew and 122 passengers. At the time, it was the worst accident in aviation history.
6 April 1956: C-124 52-1078, crashed on takeoff from Travis AFB. Three of the seven crew members died in the crash. The cause of the crash was attributed to the crossing of the elevator control cables by maintenance personnel.
 2 April 1957: C-124A 51-5176, crashed on final approach in Cambridge Bay, Nunavut (at the time, in the Northwest Territories) while ferrying supplies for the construction of the DEW Line station. There were no fatalities and the aircraft was damaged beyond repair.
31 August 1957: C-124C 52-1021, operated by the 1st Strategic Squadron, crashed during an instrument approach to Biggs Air Force Base in El Paso, Texas, USA, in bad weather after a flight from Hunter AFB near Savannah, Georgia, USA. Five aircrew were killed, ten injured.
4 September 1957, C-124A 51-5173 en route from Larson AFB, Washington crashed while attempting a landing at Binghamton Airport, Binghamton, New York. The C-124A was delivering 20 tons of equipment for Link Aviation. The crew of nine survived.
27 March 1958: C-124C 52-0981 collided in midair with a USAF Fairchild C-119C Flying Boxcar, 49-0195, over farmland near Bridgeport, Texas, United States, killing all 15 on the Globemaster and all three on the Flying Boxcar. The two transports crossed paths over a VHF omnidirectional range (VOR) navigational radio beacon during cruise flight under instrument flight rules in low visibility. The C-124 was on a north-north-easterly heading flying at its properly assigned altitude of 7,000 ft (2,100 m); the C-119 was on a southeasterly heading, and the crew had been instructed to fly at 6,000 ft (1,800 m), but their aircraft was not flying at this altitude when the collision occurred.
16 October 1958: C-124C 52-1017 crashed into a 3,200 ft (980 m) mountain near Cape Hallett Bay, killing seven of the 13 on board. Navigational errors were made during this air-drop mission over Antarctica.
18 April 1960: C-124C 52-1062 crashed into a 450 ft (137 m) hillside after taking off in heavy fog from Stephenville-Harmon Air Force Base, Newfoundland and Labrador, Canada, killing all nine on board.
24 May 1961: C-124 51-0174 crashed following takeoff from McChord Air Force Base. Eighteen of the 22 passengers and crew were killed. M/Sgt Llewellyn Morris Chilson, the second-highest decorated soldier of World War II, was one of the four survivors.
2 January 1964: C-124C 52–0968 flying from Wake Island Airfield to Hickam Air Force Base, Honolulu disappeared over the ocean, 1,200 km west of Hawaii. Eight crew and one passenger were lost in the accident.
22 January 1965: C-124 52-1058 crashed into mountains while on approach to Athens Airport. All ten passengers and crew were killed.
12 February 1966: C-124 52-0980 crashed into the 11,423-foot Pico Mulhacén in the Sierra Nevada mountains while on a flight from Morón Air Base to Murcia–San Javier Airport, Spain.
28 July 1968: C-124A 51-5178 flying from Paramaribo-Zanderij to Recife, while on approach to land at Recife, flew into a 1,890 ft high hill, 50 miles (80 km) away from Recife. The ten occupants died.
26 August 1970: C-124 52-1049 crashed on approach to Cold Bay Airport in the Aleutian Islands. All seven on board were killed.
3 May 1972: C-124 52-1055 crashed on approach to Johan Adolf Pengel International Airport, all 11 on board were killed.

Surviving aircraft

South Korea
 52-0943 – C-124C on static display at the KAI Aerospace Museum in Sacheon, Yeongnam.

United States
 49-0258 – C-124A on static display at the Air Mobility Command Museum at Dover Air Force Base near Dover, Delaware. In July 2005, museum volunteers reattached the aircraft's wings and clamshell doors. It had previously been displayed at the Strategic Air Command Museum at Offutt Air Force Base, Nebraska since 1969.
 51-0089 – C-124C on static display at the Museum of Aviation at Robins Air Force Base in Warner Robins, Georgia.
 52-0994 – C-124C on static display at the McChord Air Museum at McChord Field in Lakewood, Washington. This aircraft was formerly under civilian registration N86599 and located for many years at the Detroit Institute of Aeronautics. On 9 October 1986 the aircraft was flown non-stop from Selfridge Air National Guard Base near Detroit, Michigan to McChord Field. While flying over Washington state the aircraft was joined by a Lockheed C-130 Hercules and Lockheed C-141 Starlifter of McChord's 62nd Military Airlift Wing. This is the last recorded flight of a C-124.
 52-1000 – C-124C on static display at the Travis Air Force Base Heritage Center at Travis Air Force Base in Fairfield, California. The museum was given the C-124 in August 1982. The aircraft had been stored for many years outside at the Aberdeen Proving Ground in Aberdeen, Maryland where it was used as a storage shed. Transporting the aircraft by ground to California would have been prohibitively expensive so the decision was made to fly the aircraft to the museum. Volunteers joined with members of the Georgia Air National Guard's 116th Tactical Fighter Wing from Dobbins Air Force Base to restore the C-124 to an airworthy and ferryable condition. The aircraft was then ferried from Aberdeen to Dobbins AFB in Georgia where members of the 116 TFW completed the aircraft's restoration. The aircraft was then flown cross country to Norton Air Force Base in San Bernardino, California. After a photo session over the Golden Gate Bridge the C-124 arrived at the Jimmy Doolittle Air & Space Museum at exactly 1400 on 10 June 1984. This was the first recorded flight of a C-124 in nearly a decade.
 52-1004 – C-124C on static display at the Pima Air and Space Museum in Tucson, Arizona.
 52-1066 – C-124C on static display at the National Museum of the United States Air Force at Wright-Patterson Air Force Base in Dayton, Ohio. This was one of the last two Air National Guard C-124s retired in 1974. The aircraft is displayed with serial number 51-0135.
 52-1072 – C-124C on static display at the airpark at Charleston Air Force Base in Charleston, South Carolina.
 53-0050 – C-124C on static display at the Hill Aerospace Museum at Hill Air Force Base in Roy, Utah. In 1992, the aircraft was rescued from the Aberdeen Proving Ground in Maryland, which planned to use it for ballistics testing.

Specifications (C-124C Globemaster II)

See also

References

Notes

Citations

Bibliography

 Berlin, Earl. Air Force Legends Number 206: Douglas C-124 Globemaster II. Simi Valley, California, USA: Steve Ginter, 2000. .
Connors, Jack. The Engines of Pratt & Whitney: A Technical History. Reston, Virginia: American Institute of Aeronautics and Astronautics, 2010. .
Francillon, René J. McDonnell Douglas Aircraft since 1920. London: Putnam, 1979. .

External links

 The Air Mobility Command Museum
Fact Sheets : Douglas C-124C Globemaster National Museum of the USAF

1940s United States military transport aircraft
C-124
Four-engined tractor aircraft
Aircraft first flown in 1949
Low-wing aircraft
Four-engined piston aircraft